Christian ritual may refer to:

 Christian liturgy
 Christian prayer
 Christian worship
 Sacrament